Caterina Chiara Bosetti (born 2 February 1994) is an Italian professional volleyball player. She plays for Italy women's national volleyball team. She has competed in the 2012 Summer Olympics.

Career

The daughter of Giuseppe Bosetti, former coach of Italy's volleyball female national team, and Franca Bardelli, who played 93 times for the latter, she was born at Busto Arsizio. Her sister Lucia Bosetti is also a volleyball player.

Bosetti won the silver medal in the 2014 FIVB Club World Championship after her club lost 0-3 to the Russian Dinamo Kazan in the championship match.
She played with her national team at the 2014 World Championship. There her team ended up in fourth place after losing 2-3 to Brazil the bronze medal match. She was selected to play the Italian League All-Star game in 2017.

Awards

Individuals
 2011 FIVB U20 World Championship "MVP"
 2011 FIVB U20 World Championship "Best Spiker"
 2017-18 Italian League "All-Star"
 2022 FIVB Nations League "Best Outside Spiker"

Clubs
 2010 Italian Cup -  Champions, with Villa Cortese
 2011 Italian Cup -  Champions, with Villa Cortese
 2012 Italian Supercup -  Runner-up, with Villa Cortese
 2013 Italian Cup -  Runner-up, with Villa Cortese
 2013 Paulista Championship— Champions, with Molico Osasco
 2014 Brazilian Cup— Champions, with Molico Osasco
 2014 South American Club Championship -  Runner-up, with Molico Osasco
 2014 FIVB Club World Championship -  Runner-up, with Molico Osasco

References 

1994 births
Sportspeople from the Province of Varese
Italian women's volleyball players
Living people
Olympic volleyball players of Italy
Volleyball players at the 2012 Summer Olympics
Expatriate volleyball players in Turkey
Italian expatriates in Brazil
Italian expatriate sportspeople in Turkey
Galatasaray S.K. (women's volleyball) players
Volleyball players at the 2020 Summer Olympics
Serie A1 (women's volleyball) players